Mohammad Sarengat (October 28, 1939 – October 13, 2014) was an Indonesian track and field sprinter. Sarengat became the first Indonesian athlete to win a gold medal at the Asian Games. He won gold in the 100-meter sprint at the 1962 Asian Games.

Born in Kedunguter in Banyumas Regency, he grew up in Batang Regency before settling in Surabaya. He came from a sporting family – his uncle Mursanyoto was a goalkeeper for the Indonesia national football team.

Sarengat won the gold medal in the 100-meter sprint at the 1962 Asian Games held in Jakarta in 10.4 seconds. The win made Sarengat the first Indonesian gold medalist at any Asian Games. He also won a second gold medal at the competition, winning the 110-meter hurdles with an Asian record time of 14.3 seconds. He also won a bronze medal in the 200-meter sprint. Sarengat held the Indonesian record for the 100-meter sprint (10.4 seconds) for the next twenty-two years, until it was broken by sprinter Purnomo M. Yudhi at the 1984 Summer Olympics in Los Angeles.

Only two other Indonesian athletes have won gold medals at the Asian Games since 1962 - Supriyati Sutono and Maria Natalia Londa. Following his Asian Games win, his only other international medal of note was a silver medal in the 110 m hurdles at the 1963 GANEFO Games, where he placed behind China's Gao Jiqiao. Following his retirement, a football stadium in Batang Regency (his home area) was named in honour as the Moh Sarengat Stadium.

After finishing his sports career he trained as a medic and went on to serve as physician for the Indonesian vice president Adam Malik. Sarengat died on October 13, 2014, at Pondok Indah Hospital in South Jakarta at the age of 73. He had been hospitalized since suffering a stroke in 2012. He was survived by his wife and children.

References

1939 births
2014 deaths
Indonesian male sprinters
Asian Games gold medalists for Indonesia
Asian Games medalists in athletics (track and field)
Athletes (track and field) at the 1962 Asian Games
Sportspeople from Central Java
Asian Games bronze medalists for Indonesia
Medalists at the 1962 Asian Games
Deaths from cerebrovascular disease
20th-century Indonesian people